Aeolus, or, in full, Atmospheric Dynamics Mission-Aeolus (ADM-Aeolus), is an Earth observation satellite operated by the European Space Agency (ESA). It was built by Airbus Defence and Space and launched on 22 August 2018. ADM-Aeolus is the first satellite with equipment capable of performing global wind-component-profile observation and will provide much-needed information to improve weather forecasting. Aeolus is the first satellite capable of observing what the winds are doing on Earth, from the surface of the planet and into the stratosphere 30 km high.

The satellite was named after Aeolus, a god from the Greek mythology, the ruler of the winds.

Program 
The program was initially approved in 1999 for a 2007 launch but technological obstacles caused 11 years of delay, as it was launched on 22 August 2018. For an estimated €481 million (US$568 million) program cost, it should provide 64,000 daily profiles from March or April 2019. Its altitude is a low  for enough backscattered light sensibility, inducing a short 3 years life expectancy.

Mission 
Aeolus is the fifth planned satellite in the Living Planet Programme (LPP) of the European Space Agency (ESA). The main goal of this mission is to further develop the knowledge of Earth's atmosphere and weather systems. By recording and monitoring the weather in different parts of the world, Aeolus will allow scientists to build complex weather models, which can then be used to help predict how that environment will behave in the future. These predictions will be useful in the short-term, since they can be applied to numerical weather prediction in order to make forecasts more accurate. The mission will thus improve the knowledge of all sorts of weather phenomena, from global warming to the effects of air pollution. Aeolus is seen as a mission that will pave the way for future operational meteorological satellites dedicated to study Earth's wind profiles.

Satellite 
The spacecraft was built by Airbus Defence and Space. In 2014, the integration of ALADIN instrument was completed and vacuum along with vibration testing begun. On 7 September 2016, ESA and Arianespace signed a contract to secure the launch of the Aeolus satellite.

Scientific payload 
The wind-component profiles will be measured by the Atmospheric LAser Doppler INstrument (ALADIN).

ALADIN 
The ALADIN instrument (Atmospheric Laser Doppler Instrument) is a direct detection ultraviolet laser lidar consisting of three major elements: a transmitter, a combined Mie and Rayleigh backscattering receiver assembly, and a Cassegrain telescope with a  diameter. The transmitter architecture is based on a 150 mJ pulsed diode-pumped Nd:YAG laser, frequency-tripled to provide 60 millijoules pulses of ultraviolet light at 355 nm. This frequency was chosen because of the increased Rayleigh scattering in the ultraviolet region of the spectrum, and because it is eye-safe at distances greater than several hundred metres. The Mie receiver consists of a Fizeau interferometer with a resolution of 100 MHz (equivalent to 18 m/s). The received backscatter signal produces a linear fringe whose position is directly linked to the wind velocity; the wind speed is determined by the fringe centroid position to better than a tenth of the resolution (1.8 m/s). The Rayleigh receiver employs a dual-filter Fabry–Pérot interferometer with a 2 GHz resolution and 5 GHz spacing. It analyzes the wings of the Rayleigh spectrum with a CCD; the etalon is split into two zones, which are imaged separately on the detector. The lidar is aimed 35° from nadir and 90° to the satellite track (on the side away from the Sun).

The processing of the backscatter signals will produce line-of-sight wind-component profiles above thick clouds or down to the surface in clear air along the satellite track, every . Wind information in thin cloud or at the tops of thick clouds is also attainable; from the data processing, information on other elements like clouds and aerosols can also be extracted. The data will be disseminated to the main numerical weather prediction centres in near-real time.

Development of the ALADIN instrument has been problematic. The ultraviolet laser was causing damage to the optical surfaces in a vacuum. ESA scientists asked NASA for support; however, NASA has minimal experience with lidar of this design. Technology required for the satellite was pushing the technology envelope; therefore, after problematic development, ESA asked Airbus to perform additional full-model tests in a vacuum before continuing mission development. Overall complications involved in the instrument caused an estimated 50% final cost overrun, so ESA had to come up with additional funding for the project.

Launch 
Aeolus was designed to be compatible with many small-capacity launch vehicles such as Vega, Rokot or Dnepr. In November 2013, ESA scheduled the launch on a VEGA in one of the five flights of the VERTA Programme, but in 2015 launch was postponed to August 2018 due to problems with their lidar development. A €32.57 million launch contract with Arianespace was signed on 7 September 2016. The launch finally took place on 22 August 2018 on a Vega launch vehicle from French Guiana at 18:20 local time.

Status 
The satellite was launched on 22 August 2018. Three months of testing was conducted before including data in weather models. One year of usage has resulted in reduced power from the primary laser. After switching to the second laser, the instrument is meeting mission objectives.

In mid-2019, ESA determined that the UV laser was losing power: it started with pulses of 65 millijoules once it reached orbit, but that energy declined 20 to 30% in the first nine months, and was losing one millijoule per week in May 2019. ESA then decided to switch to a backup laser that had not been used, offering the opportunity to complete the expected 3 year life of the satellite. The report also said that the satellite's orbit at 320 km required re-boosting every week, limiting the satellite's life to the available propellant.

In 2020 it was reported that measurements from Aeolus enabled ECMWF to partly compensate for reduced measurements from commercial aircraft at the start of the COVID-19 outbreak. 

In September 2021, since it was launched three years ago, Aeolus has far exceeded expectations and frequently hailed a remarkable success. It was developed as a research mission and to demonstrate how novel laser technology could deliver vertical profiles of Earth's wind. These measurements were much needed, for example by the World Meteorological Organization's Global Observing System, which is a coordinated system of methods and facilities for making meteorological and environmental observations on a global scale.

It is expected to reenter the atmosphere in 2023.

See also 

 BIOMASS
 CryoSat and CryoSat-2
 EarthCARE
 FLEX
 Gravity Field and Steady-State Ocean Circulation Explorer (GOCE)
 Soil Moisture and Ocean Salinity (SMOS)
 Swarm

References

External links 

 Aeolus page at Airbus Defence and Space
 Aeolus pages at ESA, with latest news
 Aeolus blog by Gilles Labruyère, mechanics engineer in the Aeolus project

Earth observation satellites of the European Space Agency
Spacecraft launched in 2018
Spacecraft launched by Vega rockets
2018 in French Guiana